Oba Adedapo Adewale Tejuoso is the Osile of Oke Ona Egbaland. He is the father of Senator Lanre Tejuoso.

Oba Tejuoso was born to Joseph Somoye Tejuoso and Esther Bisoye Tejuoso, who was the granddaughter of Oba Karunwi I of Oke Ona.

References

Yoruba monarchs
Adedapo
Living people
1938 births